Stenoptilia eborinodactyla is a moth of the family Pterophoridae. It is found on the chalk steppes of Russia.

References

Moths described in 1986
eborinodactyla
Moths of Asia
Moths of Europe